Throwing It All Away is the debut album by Irish musician Rob Smith. It was released on 15 March 2008.

Track listing 

 "Intro : The Jam"
 "One for the Modern"
 "Out in the Sunshine"
 "Stand Up"
 "Soul Shaker"
 "Interlude: La Mano de Dios"
 "(People) Come with Me"
 "So Many, So Near"
 "Laugh All the Way to Town"
 "When Your Feet Were Dancing"
 "Piano Tune"
 "Lasagne" - hidden track

References

2008 debut albums
Rob Smith (Irish musician) albums